Mark Philippoussis was the defending Tennis champion, but Thomas Enqvist defeated him 6–4, 6–1, in the final.

Players

Draw

Main draw

Play-offs

External links
Official Colonial Classic website
1999 Colonial Classic results

Kooyong Classic
Col